James Reid McInch (born 27 June 1953) is a Scottish former professional footballer.

Career

Born in Glasgow, McInch began his career as a youth player with Cardiff City where he formed a partnership with future Wales international Derek Showers. He was also part of the side that reached the 1971 FA Youth Cup final before losing 2–0 on aggregate to Arsenal. McInch was handed his professional debut in the 1972–73 season but struggled to build on his early promise and made just fifteen first-team appearances, with his only goal coming in the League Cup, before being released in 1975.

He instead joined Bath City, scoring his first goal in a 2–0 win over Wimbledon on 22 October 1975, spending two years with the club, including playing in the final of the 1977 Anglo-Italian Cup against Lecco.

References

1953 births
Living people
Footballers from Glasgow
Scottish footballers
Cardiff City F.C. players
Bath City F.C. players
English Football League players
Association football forwards